The English Presbyterian Church of Wales is in City Road, Chester, Cheshire, England.  The church was built in 1864, and designed by Michael Gummow of Wrexham.  It is constructed with a stuccoed front and brick sides, and has a slate roof.  The architectural style is Neoclassical,  Its entrance front is in five bays; it has a portico with four Ionic columns, and a three-bay pediment.  The opposite end of the church is apsidal.  The church is recorded in the National Heritage List for England as a designated Grade listed building.

See also

Grade II listed buildings in Chester (east)

References

Churches in Chester
Presbyterian Church of Wales
Churches completed in 1864
19th-century Presbyterian churches
Grade II listed churches in Cheshire
Grade II listed buildings in Chester
Greek Revival church buildings in the United Kingdom
Neoclassical architecture in Cheshire
19th-century churches in the United Kingdom
Neoclassical church buildings in England